Echinopsis pentlandii,  is a species of Echinopsis found in Bolivia and Peru.

References

External links
 
 

pentlandii